Kameron David Loe (born September 10, 1981) is an American former professional baseball pitcher. He played in Major League Baseball (MLB) for the Texas Rangers, Milwaukee Brewers, Seattle Mariners, Chicago Cubs, and Atlanta Braves. At , Loe was one of the tallest players in the long history of the game.

Baseball career

Amateur
Kameron Loe played high school baseball at Granada Hills High School with Ryan Braun.

Loe played college baseball at California State University, Northridge from 1999 to 2002, and was drafted by the Texas Rangers in the 20th round of the 2002 Major League Baseball Draft.

Texas Rangers
He made his MLB debut with the Rangers on September 26, 2004, against the Seattle Mariners, working 2.2 scoreless innings of relief. In his next appearance on September 29, he made his first start against the Anaheim Angels. He allowed five runs in 4 innings though did not receive a decision.

He recorded his first win in a two inning extra-inning relief appearance against the Angels on June 29, 2005. In the 2005 season, Loe made 48 appearances, 8 of them starts, compiling a record of 9–6, with a 3.42 ERA.  Loe missed much of the  due to a bone bruise in his right elbow.

In late March 2008 he was considered one of three pitchers vying for one long relief spot with the team, along with Josh Rupe and Scott Feldman.

From 2004-2008 with the Rangers, he pitched in 107 games (47 starts) with a 4.77 ERA.

Fukuoka SoftBank Hawks
On November 20, 2008, Loe was acquired by the Fukuoka SoftBank Hawks. He appeared in just 5 games for the Hawks and was 0-4 with a 6.33 ERA.

Milwaukee Brewers

On December 18, 2009, Loe signed a minor league contract with the Milwaukee Brewers, which contained an invitation to spring training. After beginning the season with the AAA Nashville Sounds, Loe was called up to the big league roster by the Brewers on June 1, 2010.

In 2011, he was 4-7 with a 3.50 ERA. In 2012, Loe went 6-5 with a 4.61 ERA with 68.1 innings in 70 appearances.

On November 2, Loe elected to become a free agent after refusing his minor league assignment. In parts of 3 seasons with the Brewers, he was 13-17 with a 3.67 ERA in 195 games (all in relief).

Seattle Mariners
He signed a minor league contract with the Seattle Mariners before the 2013 season and was added to the 40 man roster on March 25, 2013. He was designated for assignment on April 11.

Chicago Cubs
After being released by the Mariners, Loe signed a minor league contract with the Chicago Cubs. Following many relief pitching appearances, he was released on May 10, 2013.

Atlanta Braves
On May 11, 2013, Loe signed a minor league contract with the Atlanta Braves. After pitching in 21 games for Triple-A Gwinnett, he was called up on July 21. On July 29, Loe was designated for assignment to make room for the recently acquired Scott Downs. Loe pitched in 2 games with Atlanta, giving up 3 runs in 2.2 innings. Loe did not make the Braves' postseason roster,

San Francisco Giants
Loe signed a minor league deal with the San Francisco Giants on January 13, 2014.  On March 22, 2014, Loe opted out of his contract and became a free agent.

Kansas City Royals
Loe signed a minor league deal with the Kansas City Royals in April 2014.

Second stint with Braves
Loe signed a minor league deal with the Atlanta Braves on May 27, 2014. He was released on June 30, 2014

Arizona Diamondbacks
Loe signed a minor league deal with the Arizona Diamondbacks on July 5, 2014. After becoming a free agent following the season, Loe tested positive for a "drug of abuse" and was suspended for 50 games.

Bridgeport Bluefish
Loe signed with the Bridgeport Bluefish of the Atlantic League of Professional Baseball.

Chicago White Sox
Loe signed a minor league deal with the Chicago White Sox on March 3, 2016.

Tigres de Quintana Roo
On April 10, 2017, Loe signed with the Tigres de Quintana Roo of the Mexican Baseball League. He became a free agent following the 2017 season.

Personal life
Married Bree Ransom of Scottsdale, AZ (2015) and they have a child by the name of Brynlee Loe who was born in 2016.

Loe owned a 7-foot boa constrictor named Angel who he put up for adoption when he left the United States and moved to Japan for his job with the Fukuoka SoftBank Hawks in 2009.

References

External links

1981 births
Living people
Águilas de Mexicali players
American expatriate baseball players in Japan
American expatriate baseball players in Mexico
Atlanta Braves players
Baseball players from Los Angeles
Bridgeport Bluefish players
Cal State Northridge Matadors baseball players
Charlotte Knights players
Chicago Cubs players
Clinton LumberKings players
Frisco RoughRiders players
Fukuoka SoftBank Hawks players
Gwinnett Braves players
Major League Baseball pitchers
Mexican League baseball pitchers
Milwaukee Brewers players
Nashville Sounds players
Nippon Professional Baseball pitchers
Oklahoma RedHawks players
People from Simi Valley, California
People from Granada Hills, Los Angeles
Pulaski Rangers players
Reno Aces players
Seattle Mariners players
Sportspeople from Ventura County, California
Stockton Ports players
Texas Rangers players
Tigres de Quintana Roo players
Leones del Escogido players
American expatriate baseball players in the Dominican Republic
Granada Hills Charter High School alumni